Blennidus atahualpa is a species of ground beetle in the subfamily Pterostichinae. It was described by Moret in 1996.

References

Blennidus
Beetles described in 1996